Marina Filipović (later Živković; born 22 December 1970) is a retired Serbian athlete who competed primarily in the 200 and 400 metres. She competed in the women's 200 metres at the 1996 Summer Olympics. She represented FR Yugoslavia at the 1997 World Championships and 1997 World Indoor Championships.

She still holds Serbian records in outdoor 200 and 400 metres, as well as indoor 400 metres.

Competition record

Personal bests
Outdoor
100 metres – 11.76 (Belgrade 1987)
200 metres – 23.28 (-0.2 m/s) (Bari 1997) NR
400 metres – 52.88 (Athens 1997) former NR
400 metres hurdles – 57.57 (Split 1990) former NR
Indoor
200 metres – 23.84 (Paris 1997)
400 metres – 53.52 (Budapest 1997) former NR

References

1970 births
Living people
Serbian female sprinters
Yugoslav female sprinters
World Athletics Championships athletes for Yugoslavia
Athletes (track and field) at the 1996 Summer Olympics
Olympic athletes of Yugoslavia
Athletes (track and field) at the 1997 Mediterranean Games
Mediterranean Games competitors for Serbia and Montenegro